Simon Greul was the defending champion, but chose not to compete.

Facundo Argüello won the title, defeating Máximo González in the final, 6–4, 6–1.

Seeds

Draw

Finals

Top half

Bottom half

References
 Main Draw
 Qualifying Draw

Aberto de Tenis do Rio Grande do Sul - Singles
2013 Singles